The Lorian Swamp is an area of wetlands on the Ewaso Ngiro river in Wajir South, Kenya. 

Apart from the Ewaso Ngiro river, the swamp is also fed by wadis from the southwest and the northeast.

The swamp lies in an arid zone.
Local annual rainfall averages between 180 and 250 mm, but varies widely from year to year. It may be much higher in wet years and much lower in dry years, so the area of the swamp varies considerably.
Potential evaporation rates in the swamp are as much as 2,600 mm per year.
The swamp may almost completely dry up in drought periods.

Little is known about the swamp, due to the hostile terrain and insecurity in the area.
It is not protected.
The swamp is infested with malarial mosquitos and with vectors of the organisms that cause bilharzia. It is home to crocodiles and is visited by many of the large savannah mammals.
Because of the dangers, cattle are not grazed far into the swamp, but they do make extensive use of the shallow waters, particularly in the dry season.

References

Sources

Wetlands of Kenya
Swamps of Africa